The Fraternity of Man were an American blues rock and psychedelic rock group from the 1960s. They are most famous for their song "Don't Bogart Me" (aka "Don't Bogart That Joint"), which was released on LP in 1968, and subsequently used in the 1969 road movie Easy Rider. The original members included three musicians from Lowell George's band The Factory – Richie Hayward (later of Little Feat), Warren Klein, and Martin Kibbee – who joined Elliot Ingber from the Mothers of Invention and Lawrence "Stash" Wagner. Blues leads were handled by Ingber, and psychedelic leads were played by Klein, including "Oh No I Don't Believe It" (widely attributed to Ingber due to his association with the Mothers). The band broke up after recording two albums.

Discography

The Fraternity of Man (1968), ABC Records ABCS-647, produced by Tom Wilson
All selections written by Fraternity of Man, except where noted.
Side One
 "In the Morning" - 4:22
 "Plastic Rat" - 3:41
 "Don't Bogart Me" - 3:00
 "Stop Me Citate Me" - 2:50
 "Bikini Baby" - 2:03
 "Oh No I Don't Believe It" - (Frank Zappa) - 6:15
Side Two
 "Wispy Paisley Skies" - 2:22
 "Field Day" - 3:59
 "Just Doin' Our Job" - 2:21
 "Blue Guitar" - 4:23
 "Last Call for Alcohol" - 3:25
 "Candy Striped Lion's Tails" - 5:17

Personnel
 Lawrence "Stash" Wagner - lead vocals, guitar
 Elliot Ingber - guitar
 Warren Klein - guitar, sitar, tambura
 Martin Kibbee - bass
 Richard Hayward - drums, backing vocals
 Earl Poole Ball - piano

Get It On! (1969), Dot Records DLP-25955, produced by Tom Wilson
Side One
 "Boo Man" - 3:14
 "Don't Start Me Talkin'" - 2:40
 "Pool of Tears" - 2:46
 "The Throbber" - 3:40
 "Cat's Squirrel" - 3:20
Side Two
 "Too High to Eat" - 3:35
 "Forget Her" - 3:34
 "Coco Lollipop" - 3:00
 "Trick Bag" - 2:38
 "Mellow Token" - 5:33

X (1995), San Francisco Sound 
Disc One (EP)
 Don't Bogart Me
 Bikini Baby
 Fherinst
 Fuck Her
 Everybody's Rockin'

Personnel
 Elliot Ingber - guitar
 Larry (Stash) Wagner - vocals, harmonica
 Earl Ball - keyboard
 Red Rhodes - steel guitar
 Ira Ingber - bass
 Grisha Dimant - guitar
 Harry Ravain - drums
 Sandy Nelson - percussion

References

American psychedelic rock music groups